Mattia Zaccagni (born 16 June 1995) is an Italian professional footballer who plays as a midfielder or striker for Serie A side Lazio and the Italy national team.

Club career
Zaccagni made his professional debut in the Lega Pro for Venezia on 10 September 2014 in a game against Südtirol.

He made his Serie A debut for Verona on 23 September 2015 as a 75th-minute substitute for Jacopo Sala in a 1–0 loss against Internazionale.

On 17 March 2020, he tested positive for COVID-19.

On 31 August 2021 Zaccagni completed a move from Hellas Verona to Lazio on loan with a conditional obligation to buy.

International career
Zaccagni was called up to the senior Italy squad in November 2020.

Career statistics

Club

International

Honours
Individual
Serie A Goal of the Year: 2021

References

External links
 

Living people
1995 births
People from Cesena
Association football midfielders
Italian footballers
Serie A players
Serie B players
Serie C players
A.C. Bellaria Igea Marina players
Hellas Verona F.C. players
Venezia F.C. players
A.S. Cittadella players
S.S. Lazio players
Footballers from Emilia-Romagna
Sportspeople from the Province of Forlì-Cesena